Killer Condom (original title Kondom des Grauens (English: Condom of Horror)) is a 1996 German horror comedy directed by Martin Walz. It is based on the comic books Kondom des Grauens and Bis auf die Knochen ("Down to the Bones") by Ralf König.

It was distributed in the United States by Troma Entertainment, which promoted the film at the Cannes Film Festival with the help of "a six-foot-long fanged condom".

Tagline: The rubber that rubs YOU out!

Plot
Set in the seedy parts of New York City, Killer Condom follows gay Detective Luigi Mackeroni (Udo Samel), who has been hired to investigate a series of bizarre attacks at the Hotel Quickie in which male guests have all had their penises mysteriously bitten off. While at the crime scene, he enlists the services of a gigolo named Billy and invites him up to the crime room. Before the two men engage in sex, a carnivorous living condom interrupts them and bites off Mackeroni's right testicle.

Now on a personal vendetta, Mackeroni begins his lone quest to not only bring a stop to the rash of condom attacks, but also face his true feelings toward Billy the gigolo.

Cast

Reception
At the time of its 1998 U.S. theatrical release, New York Times reviewer Lawrence Van Gelder said that this Troma release had "a level of deadpan humor considerably above the company's usual adolescent subnorm", and that in addition to the usual gore, the film "also deals with dislocation, urban anomie, love and tolerance". On the other hand, Los Angeles Times critic Kevin Thomas called it a "strained, tedious sex-horror comedy that doesn't travel well".

Otto Sander's "manic" performance in this "cult classic" has been cited as a "good example of his comic gifts".  In an essay entitled "When Condoms Go Bad: From Safe Sex to Five Microns to Killer Condom", film critic Thuy Daojensen has written that the film, despite its "third rate special effects", provides "comic relief while reflecting tension and anxiety over sexual activity for procreation versus merely for pleasure."

See also
Teeth (2007 film)

References

External links
 

1996 films
1990s comedy horror films
1996 LGBT-related films
German comedy horror films
German LGBT-related films
Swiss comedy horror films
1990s German-language films
LGBT-related comedy horror films
Films based on German comics
Troma Entertainment films
Films set in New York City
Live-action films based on comics
1996 comedy films
1990s German films
Foreign films set in the United States